During the 2003–04 Italian football season, Ancona Calcio competed in the Serie A.

Season summary
Ancona never won a match between September and April, recording 21 losses and seven draws: losing with Sampdoria in early spring, the side collected the certain relegation. In the whole league, it obtained just 13 points finishing last in table.

Kit
Ancona's kit was manufactured by French sports retailer Le Coq Sportif and sponsored by Banca Marche.

Players

First-team squad

Serie A

References

A.C. Ancona seasons
Ancona